Moinuddinpur Syedan (Urdu:) is a village located on the outskirts of Gujrat city. It was named after Syed Moin-ud-Din.

Demographics 
The estimated population is more than 35,000.

The major denominations are Shia Islam or Tafzeeli Sunni.

References 

Villages in Gujrat District